Matt Berquist (born 11 May 1983 in Waipukurau, New Zealand) is a rugby union player who plays at fly-half for Benetton Rugby Treviso in the Rabodirect Pro12.

Playing career

Provincial Rugby

Berquist attended the University of Otago and represented Otago in 2003 and 2004.

In 2005, he transferred to Hawke's Bay where he would blossom as a player, helping the Magpies turnaround from perennial struggles to Air New Zealand Cup semi-finalists in 2008 and 2009. During this time, Berquist earned a reputation as one of the best goal-kickers in the competition, finishing as the Cup's leading scorer in 2009.

For the 2010 ITM Cup, Berquist transferred to Auckland. He again topped 100 points in the competition, including finally scoring his first provincial try in his 8th season in the competition.

Super Rugby

Berquist was initially a member of the Highlanders in 2004 while still playing for Otago, but he failed to see action in a single game.

Berquist's strong performances for Hawke's Bay earned him a Super 14 contract with the Highlanders for the 2009 season. After starting the season as a bench player, he started 6 of the final 7 matches of the season at his preferred position of fly-half. He shared goal-kicking duties with Daniel Bowden and finished the season with 49 points, including his first try in Super Rugby.

For 2010, Berquist faced increased competition for the starting fly-half position with the Highlanders from Michael Hobbs and Robbie Robinson, although he still managed to match his 2009 total with 6 starts. His goal-kicking opportunities decreased from 2009 due to the emergence of Israel Dagg as one of the top goal-kickers in Super 14.

In 2011, Berquist was back up for Dan Carter at the Crusaders.

European Rugby

Berquist signed for Leinster Rugby for the 2011–12 Pro12 season. He was to play back up to Johnny Sexton. He spent almost his entire first season injured which allowed Ian Madigan to emerge in his absence. His contract was not renewed after his first season.

He joined Biarritz in the summer of 2012 but similarly struggled to get any game action. Berquist joined Benetton Treviso in the summer of 2013.

References

External links
Leinster Profile

Living people
1983 births
New Zealand rugby union players
New Zealand expatriate rugby union players
University of Otago alumni
Hawke's Bay rugby union players
Otago rugby union players
Auckland rugby union players
Highlanders (rugby union) players
Crusaders (rugby union) players
Leinster Rugby players
Biarritz Olympique players
Benetton Rugby players
Expatriate rugby union players in France
Expatriate rugby union players in Italy
Expatriate rugby union players in Ireland
New Zealand expatriate sportspeople in France
New Zealand expatriate sportspeople in Italy
New Zealand expatriate sportspeople in Ireland
Rugby union fly-halves
Rugby union fullbacks
People from Waipukurau
Rugby union players from the Hawke's Bay Region